Hämäläinen is a surname originating in Finland (in Finnish, it means "Tavastian"), where it is the sixth most common surname. Notable people with the surname include:

Aatu Hämäläinen (born 1987), Finnish professional ice hockey player
Antony Hämäläinen (born 1980), Finnish musician and composer, now in the U.S.
Brian Hamalainen (born 1989), Danish player of football (soccer)
Eduard Hämäläinen (born 1969), Finnish decathlete
Elias Hämäläinen (born 1985), Finnish musician, winner of Finnish X Factor 2010
Erik Hämäläinen (born 1965), Finnish player of ice hockey
Helvi Hämäläinen (1907–1998), Finnish author
Jaana Hämäläinen, Finnish curler
Jyrki Hämäläinen (1942–2008), Finnish magazine editor and biographer
Kalevi Hämäläinen (1932–2005), Finnish cross country skier
Kasper Hämäläinen (born 1986), Finnish footballer
Kyösti Hämäläinen (born 1945), Finnish rally driver
Niko Hämäläinen (born 1997), Finnish-American Footballer
Pekka Hämäläinen (1938–2013), Finnish football player and administrator
Pekka Hämäläinen (born 1967), Finnish history professor at University of Oxford
Pentti Hämäläinen (1929–1984), Finnish bantamweight boxer
Raimo Hämäläinen (born 1948), Finnish professor of mathematics
Rasmus Hämäläinen (born 1994), Finnish ice hockey player
Sirkka Hämäläinen (born 1939), Finnish economist, governor of the Bank of Finland
Tapio Hämäläinen (1922–2008), Finnish actor
Ville Hämäläinen (born 1981), Finnish professional ice hockey player

References

Finnish-language surnames